Yalamanchili is a given name and surname. Notable people with the name include:

Yalamanchili Veeranjaneyulu, Indian politician
Sudhakar Yalamanchili, American engineer